The 2014–15 UAE Pro League, known as the Arabian Gulf League for sponsorship reasons, was the 40th top-level football season in the United Arab Emirates. Fourteen teams participated with Al Ahli as the defending champions after securing the championship last season for the first time since the 2008–09 campaign.

The league was started on 15 September 2014 and was concluded on 15 May 2015.

Teams
Al Shaab and Dubai Club were relegated to the second tier being replaced by Al Ittihad Kalba and Fujairah who were both relegated in the 2012–13 campaign.

Stadia and locations

Managerial changes

League table

Results

Season statistics

Goalscorers

Hat-tricks

Assists

References

UAE Pro League seasons
UAE
1